Don Guido Colonna, dei principi di Paliano, noble of Rome, patrician of Naples and Venice (16 April 1908, in Naples – 27 January 1982, in Milan) was an Italian aristocrat, diplomat and European Commissioner.

Biography
Guido Colonna di Paliano was a scion of the Colonna family, from the branch of the Princes of Paliano and the sub-branch of the Princes of Summonte (his elder brother Carlo would eventually succeed their uncle as 5th Prince of Summonte in 1956). He was the seventh child and fourth son of Don Stefano Colonna, dei principi di Paliano (1870-1948) (a son of the 3rd Prince of Summonte), and his wife Maria Dorotea Cianciulli (1875-1942). Marquess Guglielmo Imperiali (1858-1944), an influential diplomat and Italian ambassador to London during the First World War, was the husband of his paternal aunt. Through his mother, he was a descendant of Michelangelo, Marquess Cianciulli (1734-1819), a jurist and Minister of Justice of the Kingdom of Naples, famous for settling the bill of law abolishing feudalism in that Kingdom.

Guido Colonna himself graduated in law in 1930 from the University of Naples. Before the Second World War, he served in America as Italy's vice-consul to New York City from 1934 to 1937 and then to Toronto from 1937 to 1939. From 1939 to 1940 he was secretary of the Italian embassy in Cairo.
 
After the war, he was Secretary-General of the Italian delegation at the Marshall Plan negotiations (October 1947-March 1948), then Deputy Secretary-General of the Organisation for European Economic Co-operation (10 May 1948-July 1956). In 1956, he was appointed deputy general director for political affairs in the Italian foreign affairs ministry. He was promoted to the rank of minister on 20 October 1957. From December 1958 to July 1962, he was Italian ambassador to Norway, succeeding Paolo Vita Finzi.  He was deputy secretary general of NATO from 1962 to 1964.
 
On 30 July 1964 he succeeded Giuseppe Caron as European Commissioner for Internal Market & Services in the second Hallstein Commission and he remained in the succeeding Rey Commission of 1967 as Industry Commissioner until his resignation in May 1970 just before the commission's term of office expired. His resignation from the Rey Commission and the subsequent delay in appointing a successor confirmed reports that the Member States would not renew Rey's mandate that expired at the end of June 1970.

After the end of his political career, Guido Colonna di Paliano returned to the private sector as President of the Italian department store chain "Rinascente".  He also became a member of the Trilateral Commission.

Personal life
On 8 June 1938 in New York, Colonna, at the time Italian vice consul at Toronto, married Tatiana Conus, daughter of Julius Conus (Yúlij Eduárdovič Konyús), a Russian pianist and composer of French origin, and of Princess Maria Alexandrovna Lieven. She was born in Moscow on 1 December 1916 and died in Milan on 29 July 2009. They had three children: Don Piero Colonna (born in Toronto 25 December 1938), Don Stefano Colonna (born in Cairo 21 March 1940) and Donna Maria Cristina Colonna (born in Stockholm 16 December 1941). On 23 June 1967, in Paris, the latter married Count Patrice de Vogüé (born in Paris 8 December 1928), descendant of the diplomat and archeologist Melchior de Vogüé and owner of Vaux-le-Vicomte, a famous historical French château which he received from his father on the day of his marriage.

Tatiana Colonna and her children are the subject of a story told by Italian writer Curzio Malaparte in his war novel Kaputt (published in 1944): she cures them of their fear of birds, brought on by their association of a sparrow trapped in their bedroom with the bombings they have experienced in Naples.

References

|-

|-

|-

1908 births
1982 deaths
20th-century diplomats
Giuseppe Paliano
Diplomats from Naples
Italian European Commissioners
Nobility from Naples
Secretaries General of NATO
Knights Commander of the Order of Merit of the Federal Republic of Germany
European Commissioners 1967–1970